Bill Breeden is a retired Unitarian Universalist minister, former candidate for the Indiana House of Representatives, death penalty opponent, and civil activist. Breeden remains the only person connected to the Iran-Contra Affair who served jail time. His act of political protest is the subject of a 1994 documentary.

Early life 
Breeden was born and spent the early part of his life in Odon, Indiana. He began preaching at revivals at age 15. He married his wife Glenda at age 19. Breeden earned his Bachelor's degree from Trevecca Nazarene University in 1972 and his Masters of Divinity from Nazarene Theological Seminary. Undergoing spiritual transition, Breeden left the evangelical church and joined the mainline United Christian Church in the late 1970s. During this time, Breeden and his family lived in a teepee in Brown County, Indiana.

Political Protest 
In 1986 John Poindexter resigned as President Ronald Reagan's national security advisor and took a large amount of blame for the recent Iran Contra Affair Arms for Hostages Deal. To show support for its native son, Odon Indiana city officials named a street after Poindexter and unveiled the sign shortly after his resignation. Breeden was angry that a man who had broken several laws and lied to the American people was being honored in such a fashion. This led him, and a high school friend, to steal the sign and hold it for ransom for $30 million; the same amount allegedly diverted to the Contras. Law enforcement did not approve of Breeden's actions and immediately issued a warrant for his arrest. 3 days after the theft of the sign, Breeden was arrested. After a quick trial, Breeden was sentenced and served 4 days behind bars. Breeden was the only person associated with the Iran-Contra Affair to serve any jail time. This event led to the 1994 documentary 'The Times of a Sign.'

Political career 
In 2016 Breeden was the Democratic Candidate for the Indiana House of Representatives District 46 running against Republican Incumbent Bob Heaton. Breeden campaigned in a Volkswagen Beatle which was also featured in his campaign commercial.   Breeden would lose the race by almost 30 points.

Death Penalty Opponent 
Breeden is a fierce opponent of the Death Penalty and since the 1990s has served as a spiritual advisor to inmates on death row.

References 

American Unitarian Universalists
Iran–Contra affair
Anti–death penalty activists
Living people
Year of birth missing (living people)